Wesley Lee Roberts (born August 1, 1957) is a former American football Defensive end. He played for the New York Jets in 1980.

References

1957 births
Living people
American football defensive ends
TCU Horned Frogs football players
New York Jets players
Michigan Panthers players